Henry Clifford Parker (6 September 1913 – 1983) was an English footballer born in Denaby, Yorkshire, who played as an outside left for Doncaster Rovers and Portsmouth in the Football League. During the War he worked at the aircraft factory in Hamble-le-Rice and also played football for their works team Folland Aircraft. He scored twice as Portsmouth beat Wolverhampton Wanderers 4–1 in the 1939 FA Cup Final.

Honours
Portsmouth
 FA Cup winner: 1939

References

1913 births
1983 deaths
People from Conisbrough
Footballers from Doncaster
English footballers
Association football forwards
Denaby United F.C. players
Doncaster Rovers F.C. players
Portsmouth F.C. players
Folland Sports F.C. players
English Football League players
FA Cup Final players